Wake Up Everybody is an album released by Harold Melvin & the Blue Notes on the Philadelphia International record label in November 1975. It was produced by Kenneth Gamble & Leon Huff. This would be the last album to include Teddy Pendergrass before he left the group for a solo career.

The album features the hit singles "Wake Up Everybody" and "Tell the World How I Feel About 'Cha Baby".  "Don't Leave Me This Way", which would be reinterpreted two years later by Thelma Houston, was a hit on the UK Singles Chart, peaking at #5.  The lead vocal on the closing album track, "Searching for a Love", was performed virtually solo by Sharon Paige, who also performed duet duties with Pendergrass and Melvin on the song "You Know How to Make Me Feel So Good."

The album was remastered and reissued with a bonus track, a Tom Moulton remixed version of "Don't Leave Me This Way", in 2008 by Legacy Recordings.

Track listing

Personnel
Harold Melvin, Teddy Pendergrass, Bernard Wilson, Lawrence Brown, Jerry Cummings – vocals
Sharon Paige – female vocalist on "You Know How to Make Me Feel So Good" and "I'm Searching for a Love"
MFSB – music
Edward Soyka – illustrations, artwork

Charts

Singles

See also
List of number-one R&B albums of 1976 (U.S.)

References

External links
 

1975 albums
Harold Melvin & the Blue Notes albums
Albums produced by Kenneth Gamble
Albums produced by Leon Huff
Albums arranged by Bobby Martin
Albums recorded at Sigma Sound Studios
Philadelphia International Records albums